Essen II is an electoral constituency (German: Wahlkreis) represented in the Bundestag. It elects one member via first-past-the-post voting. Under the current constituency numbering system, it is designated as constituency 119. It is located in the Ruhr region of North Rhine-Westphalia, comprising the northwestern part of the city of Essen.

Essen II was created for the inaugural 1949 federal election. Since 2013, it has been represented by Dirk Heidenblut of the Social Democratic Party (SPD).

Geography
Essen II is located in the Ruhr region of North Rhine-Westphalia. As of the 2021 federal election, it comprises the Stadtbezirke I (Stadtmitte/Frillendorf), V (Altenessen/Karnap/Vogelheim), VI (Zollverein), and VII (Steele/Kray) from the independent city of Essen.

History
Essen II was created in 1949. In the 1949 election, it was North Rhine-Westphalia constituency 31 in the numbering system. From 1953 through 1961, it was number 90. From 1965 through 1976, it was number 88. From 1980 through 1998, it was number 89. From 2002 through 2009, it was number 120. Since 2013, it has been number 119.

Originally, the constituency comprised the northeastern parts of the city of Essen. From 1980 through 1998, it comprised Stadtbezirke V (Altenessen/Karnap/Vogelheim), VI (Zollverein), and VII (Steele/Kray). It acquired its current borders in the 2002 election.

Members
The constituency has been held continuously by the Social Democratic Party (SPD) since 1949. It was first represented by Karl Bergmann from 1949 to 1972, followed by Peter Reuschenbach from 1972 to 1994. Rolf Hempelmann served from 1994 to 2013. Dirk Heidenblut was elected in 2013, and re-elected in 2017 and 2021.

Election results

2021 election

2017 election

2013 election

2009 election

References

Federal electoral districts in North Rhine-Westphalia
1949 establishments in West Germany
Constituencies established in 1949
Essen